The Rainbow Party is a socialist political party in Zambia.

History
The party was established on 16 December 2014 by former Minister of Justice and Patriotic Front secretary Wynter Kabimba, together with several other prominent PF members. The party participated in the 2016 general elections, winning no seats.

References

External links

2014 establishments in Zambia
Political parties disestablished in 2014
Political parties in Zambia
Socialist parties in Zambia